Franziska Lang is an archaeologist and professor at the Technische Universität Darmstadt.

Education
Lang got an M.A. from the Free University of Berlin in 1987, and a doctor of philosophy degree in 1991 from the Free University of Berlin.

Career
Lang became a professor at the Technische Universität Darmstadt in 2005.

Publications
 Archaische Siedlungen in Griechenland : Struktur und Entwicklung, 1991
 Das Recht auf informationelle Selbstbestimmung des Patienten und die ärztliche Schweigepflicht in der gesetzlichen Krankenversicherung, 1995
 Klassische Archäologie : eine Einführung in Methode, Theorie und Praxis, 1997
 Werkraum Antike : Beiträge zur Archäologie und antiken Baugeschichte, 2012

References

1959 births
Living people
Archaeologists from Saarland
Academic staff of Technische Universität Darmstadt
Free University of Berlin alumni
German women archaeologists